Hope station is a passenger rail station in Hope, Arkansas.  The station is located on Amtrak's Texas Eagle line. Trains run daily between Chicago, Illinois, and San Antonio, Texas, and continue to Los Angeles, California,  total, three days a week.

History
The red brick Hope depot was built in 1912 by the St. Louis, Iron Mountain & Southern Railroad, a subsidiary of Missouri Pacific Railway, more commonly known as the "MoPac." The building exhibits the MoPac's signature Mediterranean Revival style architecture, especially in the gabled red tile roof. A combination depot, the building originally housed passenger and express services under one roof. 
 
The depot remained in active passenger use until November 1968, and then fell into disrepair for many years. However, the station was listed on the National Register of Historic Places on June 11, 1992. To celebrate the election of Hope native Bill Clinton to the U.S. presidency in 1992, a group of citizens advocated for the conversion of the depot into a museum focused on Clinton's life.  With the museum concept in place, the Missouri Pacific Railroad Company, by then part of Union Pacific Railroad, donated the depot to the city in 1994. Renovations were finished the next year, and the facility opened to the public. The building also houses a visitor and information center.

The tourism possibilities created by Clinton's presidency prompted civic leaders to approach Amtrak in 1993 about making Hope a regularly scheduled stop for the Texas Eagle. During the depot renovation, part of the building was set aside with the idea that it could one day serve as a passenger waiting room. The persistence and hard work of city officials paid off in October 2010 when Amtrak President and CEO Joseph Boardman traveled to Hope to announce that the stop had been approved by Amtrak and the Union Pacific. Exhibiting pride of place, each section of the concrete platform is stamped with "Hope, a Slice of the Good Life"—the city's logo and a reference to its famous watermelons.

Amtrak service began on April 4, 2013, and the first train was greeted by fireworks in the early morning hours. More than 150 local citizens boarded the Texas Eagle to ride to Texarkana, then returned on school buses to enjoy a community breakfast in Hope.

See also
List of Amtrak stations
National Register of Historic Places listings in Hempstead County, Arkansas

References

External links
Amtrak Texas Eagle Stations - Hope, AR

Hope Amtrak Station (USA Rail Guide -- Train Web)
Hope (HOP)--Great American Stations (Amtrak)

Amtrak stations in Arkansas
Hope micropolitan area
Buildings and structures in Hempstead County, Arkansas
Transportation in Hempstead County, Arkansas
Railway stations in the United States opened in 1912
Railway stations closed in 1968
Railway stations in the United States opened in 2013
Former Missouri Pacific Railroad stations
Railway stations on the National Register of Historic Places in Arkansas
2013 establishments in Arkansas
Individually listed contributing properties to historic districts on the National Register in Arkansas
1912 establishments in Arkansas
1968 disestablishments in Arkansas
National Register of Historic Places in Hempstead County, Arkansas